India is a nation that has competed at the Hopman Cup tournament on two occasions. The nation's first appearance came in 2007, courtesy of a wild card earned by winning the inaugural Asian Hopman Cup (a now defunct qualification tournament for Asian nations which ran from 2006 until 2009). This remains their best performance to date.

India also participated in the Asian Hopman Cup on two other occasions. In the 2008 and 2009 events, they failed to progress past the round robin stages of the event.

Players
This is a list of players who have played for India in the Hopman Cup.

Results

References

Hopman Cup teams
Hopman Cup
Hopman Cup